Joachim Moitzi (born 20 May 1969) is a former Austrian footballer who played as a forward.

Honours

 Austrian Football First League: 1996–1997

External links
 

1969 births
Living people
Austrian footballers
Austrian Football Bundesliga players
2. Liga (Austria) players
FC Red Bull Salzburg players
SK Rapid Wien players
SC Austria Lustenau players
FC Vaduz players
Austrian expatriate footballers
Austrian expatriate sportspeople in Liechtenstein
Expatriate footballers in Liechtenstein
Association football forwards